Ayodele Alafabusuyi Modupe (born February 4, 1996) was a Nigerian former President SCSN, FUTA long jumper.

He attended the Federal University of Technology Akure.

Competition record

References

Aladefa, Ayodele
Abilene Christian University alumni
Living people
Yoruba sportspeople
Athletes (track and field) at the 1994 Commonwealth Games
Commonwealth Games competitors for Nigeria
1970 births
Athletes (track and field) at the 1999 All-Africa Games
African Games competitors for Nigeria